Eileen Pollock (18 May 1947 – 19 December 2020) was a Northern Irish actress whose work included political theatre, pantomime, and the role of Lilo Lil in television series Bread.

Early life
Pollock was born in Belfast, and studied languages at Queen's University Belfast. Before her acting career she was a technical translator, working in London. Her first theatrical work was as ASM at the Bush Theatre, London.

Career
She is probably best known for playing the part of 'Lilo' Lill in Carla Lane's television comedy Bread in 1986-1991, and in 2004 she said: "I like it when someone says in a supermarket 'you know who you remind me of, don't take offence, that tart from Bread'." 

She was involved in the political theatre company Belt and Braces, but felt it provided too few roles for women so founded Bloomers and later Camouflage, writing several plays for the latter. She also worked with Irish companies Field Day, Charabanc and DubbelJoint, among many other touring and repertory companies.  

She has also appeared in such productions as Easter 2016 in the Play for Tomorrow series (1982), After You've Gone (1984), Far and Away (1992), and Wild About Harry, in 2000. She appeared in the film version of Frank McCourt's book, Angela's Ashes, and played "Molly", the landlady in Far and Away (1992) with Tom Cruise and Nicole Kidman, director Ron Howard. In 2010 she played Miss Kessler in Reg Traviss's Psychosis, and in 2016 she played the mother of a child with Down's syndrome in Duncan Paveling's My Feral Heart.

Stage productions in which she has had roles include The Government Inspector, Women on the verge of HRT by Marie Jones, Three Sisters (translation by Brian Friel) as well as Friel's Dancing at Lughnasa. In 2016 at The Print Room she played Bridget in Peter Gill's As Good a Time As Any, an all-women play.

Pollock performed a one-woman show Now I'm Sixty at Liverpool Academy Of Art Actors Studio in 2007, and in 2010 directed and "took a scene stealing guest credit" in The Irish Wake of Paddy McGrath at The Lion & Unicorn Theatre, London.

In 2004 she played the wicked witch in the pantomime Jack and the Beanstalk in Middlesbrough. This was her fifth pantomime, fulfilling a childhood ambition to appear in panto. She said "The wicked witch is wonderful because I can't stand children and making them want to cry and scream is a wonderful battle of wits."

In 2009, she appeared on The Justin Lee Collins Show.

Filmography

Film

Television

References

External links

1947 births
2020 deaths
Stage actresses from Northern Ireland
Film actresses from Northern Ireland
Television actresses from Northern Ireland
Actresses from Belfast
Alumni of Queen's University Belfast